Vătavu may refer to:

Marin Vătavu (born 1982), Romanian footballer
Vătavu River, river in Romania